The following outline is provided as an overview of and topical guide to galaxies:

Galaxies –  gravitationally bound systems of stars, stellar remnants, interstellar gas, dust, and dark matter. The word galaxy is derived from the Greek galaxias (γαλαξίας), literally "milky", a reference to the Milky Way. Galaxies range in size from dwarfs with just a few billion (109) stars to giants with one hundred trillion (1014) stars, each orbiting its galaxy's center of mass. Galaxies are categorized according to their visual morphology as elliptical, spiral and irregular. Many galaxies are thought to have black holes at their active centers. 

The Milky Way's central black hole, known as Sagittarius A*, has a mass four million times greater than the Sun. As of March 2016, GN-z11 is the oldest and most distant observed galaxy with a comoving distance of 32 billion light-years from Earth, and observed as it existed just 400 million years after the Big Bang. Previously, as of July 2015, EGSY8p7 was the most distant known galaxy, estimated to have a light travel distance of 13.2 billion light-years away.

What type of thing are galaxies? 

Galaxies can be described as all of the following:

 Astronomical object

Types of galaxies 

 List of galaxies
 Lists of galaxies

By morphological classification 

Galaxy morphological classification
 Disc galaxy
 Lenticular galaxy 
 Barred lenticular galaxy
 Unbarred lenticular galaxy
 Spiral galaxy   (list)
 Anemic galaxy
 Barred spiral galaxy
 Flocculent spiral galaxy
 Grand design spiral galaxy
 Intermediate spiral galaxy
 Magellanic spiral
 Unbarred spiral galaxy
 Dwarf galaxy
 Dwarf elliptical galaxy
 Dwarf galaxy#Common dwarf galaxy types
 Dwarf spheroidal galaxy
 Dwarf spiral galaxy
 Elliptical galaxy
 Type-cD galaxy
 Irregular galaxy
 Barred irregular galaxy
 Peculiar galaxy
 Ring galaxy   (list)
 Polar-ring galaxy   (list)

By nucleus 

Active galactic nucleus
 Blazar
 Low-ionization nuclear emission-line region
 Markarian galaxies
 Quasar
 Radio galaxy
 X-shaped radio galaxy
 Polar jet#Relativistic jet
 Seyfert galaxy

By emissions 

 Energetic galaxies
 Lyman-alpha emitter
 Luminous infrared galaxy
 Starburst galaxy 
 Dwarf galaxy#Blue Compact Dwarf galaxies
 Pea galaxy
 Hot, dust-obscured galaxies (Hot DOGs)
 Low activity
 Low-surface-brightness galaxy
 Ultra diffuse galaxy

By interaction 

 Field galaxy
 Galactic tide
 Galaxy cloud
 Interacting galaxy
 Galaxy merger
 Jellyfish galaxy
 Satellite galaxy
 Stellar kinematics#Stellar streams
 Superclusters
 Galaxy filament
 Void galaxy

By other aspect 

 Galaxies named after people
 Largest galaxies
 Nearest galaxies

Nature of galaxies

Galactic phenomena 

 Galactic year – duration of time required for the Sun to orbit once around the center of the Milky Way Galaxy.
 Galaxy formation and evolution
 Galaxy merger
 Hubble's Law

Galaxy components 

 Components of galaxies in general
 Active galactic nucleus
 Galactic bulge
 Galactic disc
 Galactic habitable zone
 Galactic halo
 Dark matter halo
 Galactic corona
 Galactic magnetic fields
 Galactic plane
 Galactic spheroid
 Interstellar medium
 Spiral arms
 Supermassive black hole
 Structure of specific galaxies
 Milky Way components
 Galactic Center
 Galactic quadrant
 Spiral arms of the Milky Way
 Carina–Sagittarius Arm
 Norma Arm
 Orion Arm
 Perseus Arm
 Scutum–Centaurus Arm
 Galactic ridge

Galactic cartography 

 Galactic coordinate system
 Galactic longitude
 Galactic latitude
 Galaxy rotation curve

Larger constructs composed of galaxies 

 Galaxy groups and clusters   (list)
 Local Group – galaxy group that includes the Milky Way
 Galaxy group
 Galaxy cluster
 Supercluster   (list)
 Brightest cluster galaxy
 Fossil galaxy group
 Galaxy filament

Intergalactic phenomena 

 Galactic orientation
 Galaxy merger
 Andromeda–Milky Way collision
 Hypothetical intergalactic phenomena
 Intergalactic travel
 Intergalactic dust
 Intergalactic stars
 Void   (list)

Fields that study galaxies 

 Astronomy
 Galactic astronomy – studies the Milky Way galaxy.
 Extragalactic astronomy – studies everything outside the Milky Way galaxy, including other galaxies.
 Astrophysics
 Cosmology
 Physical cosmology

Galaxy-related publications

Galaxy catalogs 

 Atlas of Peculiar Galaxies
 Catalogue of Galaxies and Clusters of Galaxies
 David Dunlap Observatory Catalogue
 Lyon-Meudon Extragalactic Database
 Morphological Catalogue of Galaxies
 Multiwavelength Atlas of Galaxies
 Principal Galaxies Catalogue
 Shapley-Ames Catalog
 Uppsala General Catalogue
 Vorontsov-Vel'yaminov Interacting Galaxies

Persons influential in the study of galaxies 

 Galileo Galilei – discovered that the Milky Way is composed of a huge number of faint stars.
 Edwin Hubble

See also 

 Barred spiral galaxy
 Galaxy color–magnitude diagram
 Dark galaxy
 Faint blue galaxy
 Galaxy color–magnitude diagram
 Illustris project
 Protogalaxy
 Metallicity#Stars
 Cosmos Redshift 7
 Large quasar group#List of LQGs
 List of quasars

References

External links 

 
 Galaxies, SEDS Messier pages
 An Atlas of The Universe
 Galaxies — Information and amateur observations
 The Oldest Galaxy Yet Found
 Galaxy classification project, harnessing the power of the internet and the human brain
 How many galaxies are in our Universe? 
 3-D Video (01:46) – Over a Million Galaxies of Billions of Stars each – BerkeleyLab/animated.

 
Galaxies